Blekinge County in Sweden held a county council election on 14 September 2014 on the same day as the general and municipal elections.

Results
There were 47 seats, the same number as in 2010. The Social Democrats won the most seats at 19, a loss of one seat.

Municipal results

References

Elections in Blekinge County
Blekinge